Debsirin School is a boys' secondary school in Thailand. Founded by King Chulalongkorn in 1885, its alumni include King Ananda Mahidol, Malaysia's founding father Tunku Abdul Rahman, more than 70 cabinet members, including five prime ministers, and numerous military leaders and dignitaries. Debsirin School participates in Jaturamitr Samakkee, a biennial traditional football competition between the four oldest boys' schools in Thailand.

History

The fifth Abbot of Wat Thep Sirin Thrawat had donated land for a school as early as 1702.
King Mongkut had tried to modernize Siam, enabling it to stand up to the European powers. He was succeeded by his 15-year-old son, Chulalongkorn, who reigned as Rama V, now known as Rama the Great. Rama V was the first Siamese king to have a Western education, having been taught by a British governess, Anna Leonowens. As Bangkok developed as the capital of the new nation of Siam, Rama V's government began several nationwide development projects, despite financial hardship. New roads, bridges, railways, hospitals and schools mushroomed throughout the country, all funded from the national budget.

In a speech at a student award ceremony in 1884, the King said;

In 1885, he founded the school, naming it in honour of his mother, Debsirindra Queen Ramphoei Phamaraphirom (Thai: รำเพยภมราภิรมย์). The school opened with 53 pupils.

During World War II Thailand, under Field Marshal Plaek Pibulsongkram, was allied with the Axis powers and declared war on the United Kingdom and United States when the Japanese attacked Pearl Harbor. Bangkok suffered heavily in the subsequent Allied bombing raids and Debsirin School, strategically located near the railway, was not spared. Most of the teaching buildings (Maen Naruemit and Choduek Laohasetthi) were destroyed. They were later rebuilt by the alumni and the Ministry of Education. The main building, renamed Maen Suksa Stan Building, was built in the Gothic style.

Today, Debsirin School has a strong alumni network (Debsirin Alumni Association) under royal patronage, several prime ministers of Thailand and members of the royal family. The school also operates as a living museum, containing exhibits on the history of the school and the development of Thai education.

Facts
School Abbreviation : D.S.
Type of School : Government Boys' Secondary School 
School Motto : (Pali)  (Be not a useless person)
School Vision : To be a leading organization of learning to international standards. Develop learners for excellence. Have virtue, morality and gentleness. Have the skills to live, aware sense of Thainess and be a world potential citizen.

Surrounding Place

Wat Debsirindrawas Ratchaworawiharn
Wat Debsirindrawas Ratchaworawiharn is a second class royal temple built at the command of King Rama V as a dedication to Queen Debsirindra, and named Wat Debsirindrawas.

Debsirin Network

Notable alumni

King of Thailand
 Ananda Mahidol; Rama VIII King of Thailand
Thai royalty
 Birabongse Bhanudej; Prince Bira of Siam, Formula One racing driver
Prime ministers of Thailand
 Khuang Aphaiwong; 4th prime minister of Thailand
 Seni Pramoj; 6th prime minister of Thailand
 Thawan Thamrongnawasawat; 8th prime minister of Thailand
 Chatichai Choonhavan; 17th prime minister of Thailand
Prime ministers of Malaysia
 Tunku Abdul Rahman; 1st prime minister of Malaysia
Politician
 Chuvit Kamolvisit; Politician
Writer
 Kulap Saipradit; or Sri Burapha Thai novelist
 Bhanubandhu Yugala;  Thai film director, producer and screenwriter
 Sombat Metanee; Thai Actor and film director
 Prabda Yoon; Thai Writer, graphic designer

References

External links
Debsirin Alumni Association Official Page

Boys' schools in Thailand
Schools in Bangkok
1885 establishments in Siam
Pom Prap Sattru Phai district